John McConnel (3 October 1806 – 27 January 1899) was pastoralist and politician in Queensland, Australia. He was a Member of the Queensland Legislative Council.

Pastoralist 
On 1 January 1851 McConnell joined in partnership with his brother David and they purchased Durundur Station, previously belonging to the Archer brothers, who moved to the Burnett region. In 1851 the McConnels owned 400 cattle and 10,000 sheep on their Brisbane River Valley properties.

Politics 
McConnel was appointed to the Queensland Legislative Council on 24 April 1861 and served until his resignation on 16 July 1868.

Later life 
He died in 1899 and was buried in Bald Hills Cemetery.

References

Members of the Queensland Legislative Council
1806 births
1899 deaths
19th-century Australian politicians
Pre-Separation Queensland